Pandithurai is a 1992 Indian Tamil-language film directed by Manoj Kumar. The film stars Prabhu and Khushbu. It was released on 15 January 1992, and completed a 100-day run. The film was remade in Telugu as Bava Bavamaridi (1993), in Hindi as Bandhan (1998) and in Kannada as Baava Baamaida (2001).

Plot 

Pandithurai left his mother and his father to live with his newlywed sister and his rich brother-in-law Malaisamy.

A few years later, Pandithurai becomes an uneducated angry youth but respects Malaisamy more than anything. Malaisamy's daughter Muthulakshmi who studied in the city comes back to her village. She then falls in love with Pandithurai. Malaisamy, who is respected among the villagers, has a secret relationship with Sindamani, a stage dancer. Pandithurai tries to stop their relationship but he fails and Malaisamy evicts him from his house.

The rest of the story is how Pandithurai punished his brother-in-law and married Muthulakshmi.

Cast 
Prabhu as Pandithurai
Khushbu as Muthulakshmi
Radha Ravi as Malaisamy
Manorama as Pandithurai's mother
Sumithra as Pandithurai's sister
Silk Smitha as Chinthamani
Goundamani as Mayilsamy
Senthil as Chola
Mansoor Ali Khan as Narasimma, Sindamani's brother
Major Sundarrajan
Ajay Rathnam as Rudramani
Singamuthu

Soundtrack 
The music was composed by Ilaiyaraaja, with lyrics written by Vaali, Gangai Amaran and Piraisoodan.

Reception 
The Indian Express wrote, "The script [..] and dialogues [..] exploit the poignant turns that are likely to be faced by a tradition-bound family in a village". C. R. K. of Kalki wrote that even actors could not rescue the film because of its outdated plot and direction.

References

External links 
 

1990s Tamil-language films
1992 films
Films scored by Ilaiyaraaja
Tamil films remade in other languages